Igor Makarov may refer to:

 Igor Makarov (footballer, born 1961), Russian footballer 
 Igor Makarov (businessman) (born 1962), Russian businessman and former cyclist
 Igor Makarov (footballer, born 1970), Russian footballer
 Igor Makarov (ice hockey) (born 1987), Russian professional ice hockey player

See also
 Ihar Makarau (born 1979), Belarusian judoka
 Ihar Makaraw (born 1985), Belarusian footballer